The 2014 Liga Indonesia Premier Division season is the nineteenth edition of Liga Indonesia Premier Division since its establishment in 1994. The competition is managed by PT. Liga Indonesia (LI). The season scheduled begins in February 2014. On 20 January, PT Liga Indonesia decided to change the schedule for the kickoff of the Premier Division this season was supposed to be held in mid-February was changed to April. After managers meeting on 27 January, PT Liga Indonesia decided that the Premier Division will begin on 15 April 2014 and will end on 27 November 2014.

This season was supposed to be followed by 66 teams (46 LI and 20 LPIS), but after the decision of the PSSI disciplinary commission on 21 December 2013, the number of participating clubs was reduced to 64 teams (46 LI and 18 LPIS) after Bontang F.C. and PSLS Lhokseumawe had been found guilty of match fixing in 2013 Indonesian Premier League playoffs. The number of participating teams can still be reduced if the club can not pass the verification that includes healthy financial condition or not in arrears in the last two seasons, and has adequate infrastructure in the form of a football stadium that meets AFC standards.

After verifying the candidates of participating teams from 3 to 28 February 2014, PT LI released the result on 10 March 2014. The list consisted of 66 teams, including three additional 2013 LPIS Premier Division teams, Persemalra Maluku Tenggara, Persewon Wondama, and Persipon Pontianak. The results were 51 teams passed, 12 teams passed with certain condition, and 3 teams didn't pass, which are Perssin Sinjai, PSSB Bireuen, and Persemalra Maluku Tenggara. Lampung FC was not included on the list.

On 8 April 2014, Persiraja Banda Aceh resigned due to lack of support from the local government. Persiraja re-joined the league after they register players for this season to the league operator although there is no guarantee of support from the local government.

In August 2014 because of financial problems, Persenga Nganjuk and Persitara Jakarta Utara withdrew from the competition and each of their results was voided. On 18 August 2014, Persidafon Dafonsoro also withdrew from the competition.

After PSIS Semarang and PSS Sleman was disqualified because of match fixing, PSGC Ciamis and Persiwa Wamena qualifies to the semifinals.

Pusamania Borneo became champion after beating Persiwa Wamena 2–1 in the final.

Teams
Bhayangkara F.C., Perseru Serui, and Persik Kediri, respectively the champions, runner-up and third-placed team in the previous season, were promoted to Indonesia Super League (ISL), and were replaced by Persiwa Wamena, Persidafon Dafonsoro, and PSPS Pekanbaru, who were relegated from the 2013 Indonesia Super League. Fourth-placed Premier Division team Persikabo Bogor failed to be promoted to the Super League after defeated by the 15th-placed finisher of the 2013 Super League, Pelita Bandung Raya by 2–1 in the promotion/relegation play-offs.

PSIR Rembang, Persiraja Banda Aceh, PSLS Lhokseumawe and Bontang FC, the bottom four teams in the Indonesian Premier League (IPL) previous season, were relegated to Premier Division.

On 21 December 2014, the PSSI disciplinary commission determined that Bontang F.C. and PSLS Lhokseumawe had been found guilty of match fixing in the 2013 Premier League playoffs, and both were relegated to the third division.

On 23 December 2013, three IPL teams, Pro Duta FC, Persepar Palangkaraya and Perseman Manokwari were rejected as ISL members, due to financial problems and not having an AFC standard stadium for a professional club, and were thus relegated to the Premier Division.

Thirteen teams of the LPIS Premier Division will participate in this season: champions PSS Sleman,  runner-up Lampung FC, Persipasi Bekasi, PSSB Bireuen, Persika Karawang, PSBL Langsa, Persikab Bandung, Persekap Pasuruan, Persifa Fak-fak, Persibangga Purbalingga, PSBI Blitar, Persires Banjarnegara and Persenga Nganjuk.

PS Kwarta Deli Serdang, Persinga Ngawi, Bintang Jaya Asahan, Martapura FC, Persigubin Gunung Bintang, Villa 2000, PSGC Ciamis and Persida Sidoarjo, respectively the champion, runner-up, and six best clubs of the 2013 Liga Indonesia First Division, were promoted to Premier Division.

On 10 March 2014, three additional 2013 LPIS Premier Division teams are added to the competition's verification list, and three teams were removed from the competition for failing the verification. The additional teams are Persemalra Maluku Tenggara, Persewon Wondama, and Persipon Pontianak, while Perssin Sinjai, PSSB Bireuen, and Persemalra Maluku Tenggara were removed. Lampung FC was not included on this list.

On 8 April 2014, Persiraja Banda Aceh resigned due to lack of support from the local government. Persiraja re-joined the league after they registered players for this season to the league, although there was no guarantee of support from the local government.

Stadium and locations

Notes

Personnel and kits

Note: Flags indicate national team as has been defined under FIFA eligibility rules. Players and Managers may hold more than one non-FIFA nationality.

Coach changes

Pre-season

In-season

Foreign players

Note:
Those players who were born and started their professional career abroad but have since gained Indonesia Residency;
Injury Replacement Players;
Deltras Sidoarjo, PSPS Pekanbaru, and PSMS Medan, allowed to register players with a maximum quota (30 players), without foreign players. If able to complete the arrears in accordance with the April 14 deadline, the club concerned may use the foreign players.
Persidafon and PSAP, players are allowed to register with the minimum quota (18 players), without foreign players. If the club can complete the arrears in accordance with the April 14 deadline, the club in question may register players up to a maximum quota, but still without any foreign players.
PSBS Biak Numfor, Perseman Manokwari, and Persisko Merangin, allowed to register players with a maximum quota (30 players), without foreign players. If able to complete the arrears in accordance with the April 14 deadline, the club concerned may use the foreign players, but not able to complete club may disqualification from league.

First round
PT Liga Indonesia announced the groupings of the Premier Division after club verification was completed on 10 March. The competition was divided into groups of six to eight, depending on the number of clubs that passed verification. The division of the groups was carried out on 18 March 2014, after re-verification of the 12 teams that qualified in the first stage of verification in February but had not met the financial aspect.

This round began on 15 April 2014 and ended on 23 August 2014. 63 teams competed in this round.

Group 1

Group 2

Group 3

Group 4

Group 5 

Persenga forfeited a game against Perseman on 28 May 2014 after they failed to appear.

Group 6

Group 7

Group 8

Second round
This round begin on 2 September 2014 and will end on 28 September 2014. Sixteen teams compete in this round.

Group J

Group K

Group L

Group M

Third round
The group winners and runners-up from the second round will be divided into two groups. Matches will start on 3 October 2014 and will end on 20 November 2014. Eight teams compete in this round.

Group N

Group P

Knock-out stage
Gelora Delta Stadium will host both semifinals and the final match. Semifinal matches will be played on November 24, 2014, and the final on November 27, 2014.

Bracket

Semifinals

Final

Champions

Achievement

Season statistics
Update for match played on 27 November 2014

Goalscorers

Own goals

Hat–tricks

Scoring
First goal of the season: Benhard Larawo for Persifa Fak-fak against Persidafon Dafonsoro (15 April 2014)
Last goal of the season:  for  against 
Fastest goal of the season: 1 minutes – Ali Usman for Persebo Bondowoso against Persbul Buol (26 April 2014)
Widest winning margin: 6 goals
PSPS Pekanbaru 6–0 PSAP Sigli (8 June 2014)
Highest scoring game: 7 goals
Perseta Tulungagung 4–3 Persekap Pasuruan (22 April 2014)
Most goals scored in a match by a single team: 6 goals
PSPS Pekanbaru 6–0 PSAP Sigli (8 June 2014)
Most goals scored in a match by a losing team: 3 goals
Perseta Tulungagung 4–3 Persekap Pasuruan (22 April 2014)
Widest home winning margin: 6 goals
PSPS Pekanbaru 6–0 PSAP Sigli (8 June 2014)
Widest away winning margin: 4 goals
Perseka Kaimana 0–4 Persewon Wondama (19 April 2014)
Persipasi Bekasi 0–4 Persika Karawang (10 May 2014)
Most goals scored by a home team: 6 goals
PSPS Pekanbaru 6–0 PSAP Sigli (8 June 2014)
Most goals scored by an away team: 4 goals
Perseka Kaimana 0–4 Persewon Wondama (19 April 2014)
Persipasi Bekasi 0–4 Persika Karawang (10 May 2014)

Clean sheets
Most clean sheets: 6
PS Kwarta
Fewest clean sheets: 0
Deltras Sidoarjo
Perseka Kaimana
Persisko Merangin
Persitema Temanggung
PPSM Sakti Magelang

Teams by province

References

Second tier Indonesian football league seasons
Indonesian Premier Division seasons
2
Indonesia
Indonesia